Mao Mengsuo (15 June 1989 – 12 June 2010) was a Chinese professional footballer who played as a winger.

Club career
Mao had only one appearance in the first season of his professional football career. He appeared in a 2008–09 Hong Kong FA Cup match, which saw NTR WF Tai Po defeating Tuen Mun Progoal by 3 goals.

Map did not appear in the next season. He was back on the field in the 2009–10 season, when he was a start-up player in five matches.

Honours
Tai Po
 Hong Kong FA Cup: 2008–09

Death
Mao Mengsuo and his girlfriend, Li Zhuoling, went to Tibet to teach rural children in June 2010. During this period, they were killed in a car accident. Tai Po's general secretary Chan Ping said he shall be one of the main members of first team next year, and the club decided that the club would no longer use the number 16 shirt Mao Mengsuo wore.

References

External links
  
 Mao Mengsuo at HKFA

1989 births
2010 deaths
Sportspeople from Changsha
Chinese footballers
Chinese expatriate footballers
Footballers from Hunan
Hong Kong First Division League players
Tai Po FC players
Expatriate footballers in Hong Kong
Road incident deaths in the People's Republic of China
Association football wingers